The following are the association football events of the year 1879 throughout the world.

Events

Clubs founded in 1879

Kjøbenhavns Boldklub

Doncaster Rovers
Fulham
Scarborough
Sunderland
Sutton Coldfield Town
Swindon Town

Cliftonville
Lisburn Distillery

Royal Haarlemsche

Montrose

FC St Gallen

Domestic cups

Births
 10 January – Bobby Walker (d. 1930), Scotland international forward in 29 matches (1900–1913), scoring eight goals.
 7 May – Ben Warren (d. 1917), England international half-back in 22 matches (1906–1911), scoring two goals.
 3 June – Vivian Woodward (d. 1954), England international forward in 23 matches (1903–1911), scoring a record 29 goals.
 21 September – Peter McWilliam (d. 1951), Scotland international half-back in eight matches (1905–1911).
 26 September – Bob Crompton (d. 1941), England international full-back in 41 matches (1902–1914); 528 games for Blackburn Rovers (1896–1920).

References

 
Association football by year